= Kanchbavli =

- village
- Location within Madhya Pradesh Location within India
- Coordinates: 23.3659764°N 77.4113845°E
- Country: India
- State: Madhya Pradesh
- District: Bhopal
- Tehsil: Huzur
- Elevation: 481 m (1,578 ft)

Population (2011)
  - Total: 270
- Time zone: UTC+5:30 (IST)
- ISO 3166 code: MP-IN
- 2011 census code: 482387

Kanchbavli is a village in the Bhopal district of Madhya Pradesh, India. It is located in the Huzur tehsil and the Phanda block.

== Demographics ==
According to the 2011 census of India, Kanchbavli has 52 households. The effective literacy rate (i.e. the literacy rate of population excluding children aged 6 and below) is 66.24%.

Demographics (2011 Census)
	Total	Male	Female
Population	270	130	140
Children aged below 6 years	33	14	19
Scheduled caste	4	3	1
Scheduled tribe	7	3	4
Literates	157	88	69
Workers (all)	78	63	15
Main workers (total)	69	59	10
Main workers: Cultivators	27	24	3
Main workers: Agricultural labourers	26	22	4
Main workers: Household industry workers	0	0	0
Main workers: Other	16	13	3
Marginal workers (total)	9	4	5
Marginal workers: Cultivators	0	0	0
Marginal workers: Agricultural labourers	9	4	5
Marginal workers: Household industry workers	0	0	0
Marginal workers: Others	0	0	0
Non-workers	192	67	125
